Marcq is a commune in the Ardennes department in northern France.

Population

Notable people 
 Anne Jean Marie René Savary, 1st Duke of Rovigo (1774–1833) a French military officer and diplomat who served in the French Revolutionary Wars, the Napoleonic Wars and the French invasion of Algeria.

See also
Communes of the Ardennes department

References

Communes of Ardennes (department)
Ardennes communes articles needing translation from French Wikipedia